Coleophora gryphipennella is a moth of the family Coleophoridae. It is found in most of Europe, from Fennoscandia to the Iberian Peninsula and Italy and from Ireland to the Black Sea.

Head whitish-ochreous or greyish-ochreous. Antennae white, ringed with dark fuscous, basal joint whitish-ochreous. Forewings greyish ochreous, in female more ochreous. Hindwings rather dark grey. The moth flies from June to July depending on the location.

The larvae feed on rose species, including Rosa acicularis, Rosa arkansana, Rosa canina, Rosa glauca, Rosa pendulina, Rosa pimpinellifolia, Rosa rubiginosa, Rosa seraphini, Rosa soulieana and Rosa tomentosa. It has also been recorded on wild strawberry, Fragaria vesca.

The larvae hatch around the end of August, making three cases during their lifetime. The final case, which is occupied after hibernation, is a laterally flattened tubular leaf case. with a mouth angle of about 60°.

Gallery

References

External links
 Coleophora gryphipennella at UKmoths

gryphipennella
Moths described in 1796
Moths of Europe
Moths of Asia
Taxa named by Jacob Hübner